Muita Calma Nessa Hora 2 is a 2014 Brazilian comedy film directed by Felipe Joffily, written by Bruno Mazzeo and Lusa Silvestre, and starring Mazzeo, Marcelo Adnet, Fernanda Souza and Andréia Horta. It is a sequel to the 2010 film Muita Calma Nessa Hora.

Plot
Three years after the trip to Búzios, four friends meet in Rio de Janeiro. Estrella (Deborah Lamm) has just got back from Argentina, Aninha (Fernanda Souza) is uncertain with the appointment of a seer, Tita (Andréia Horta) has returned from Europe in search of a job as a photographer, and Mari (Gianne Albertoni) is working on the production of a music festival. Together again, they embark on new adventures.

Cast

 Andréia Horta as Tita
 Fernanda Souza as Aninha
 Gianne Albertoni as Mari
 Débora Lamm as Estrella
 Marcelo Adnet as Augusto Henrique
 Bruno Mazzeo as Renan
 Heloísa Périssé
 Nelson Freitas
 Alexandre Nero
 Maria Clara Gueiros
 Daniel Filho
 Nizo Neto
 Lucio Mauro Filho
 Alexandra Richter
 Paulo Silvino
 Marcelo Tas
 Marco Luque
 Hélio de LaPeña
 Luis Lobianco
 Raphael Infante

References

External links
 

Brazilian comedy films
2014 comedy films
Films shot in Rio de Janeiro (city)
Films set in Rio de Janeiro (city)
2014 films
2010s Portuguese-language films